Nicole Orford (born October 10, 1992) is a Canadian former ice dancer. With former partner Thomas Williams, she placed fifth at the 2014 Four Continents Championships. She teamed up with Asher Hill in 2015.

Personal life 
Nicole Orford was born in Calgary, Alberta. She is majoring in health sciences at Simon Fraser University.

Career 
Orford began skating at age three and took up ice dancing in 2008. She formed a partnership with Malcolm Rohon O'Halloran in May 2008. They split after the 2010 Canadian Championships.

Partnership with Thomas Williams
Orford began training with Thomas Williams in May 2010. Competing on the 2010–11 ISU Junior Grand Prix series, they took the bronze medal in England and placed fifth in the Czech Republic. Junior national champions, they were sent to the 2011 World Junior Championships and finished eighth.

During the 2011–12 ISU Junior Grand Prix, Orford/Williams won gold in Brisbane, Australia, and finished sixth in Austria. Due to Skate Canada rules, they competed on the senior level at the 2012 Canadian Championships and came in sixth. They also placed sixth at the 2012 World Junior Championships.

Orford/Williams made their senior international debut in the 2012–13 season. Competing on the Grand Prix series for the first time, they placed eighth at the 2012 Rostelecom Cup and fourth at the 2012 NHK Trophy. After winning the bronze medal at the 2013 Canadian Championships, they were assigned to the 2013 Four Continents Championships and finished sixth.

In the summer of 2013, Williams injured both ankles due to boot problems, causing the team to reduce their training to 20 minutes at a time. They won bronze at the U.S. Classic and placed eighth at the 2013 Trophée Éric Bompard. Fifth at the 2014 Canadian Championships, Orford/Williams were not named in Canada's Olympic team but were sent to the 2014 Four Continents Championships, where they placed fifth.

Partnership with Asher Hill
Orford teamed up with Asher Hill following a tryout held in April 2015.

Programs

With Hill

With Williams

With Rohon

Competitive highlights 
GP: Grand Prix; JGP: Junior Grand Prix

With Hill

With Williams

With Rohon O'Halloran

References

External links 

 
 
 Nicole Orford / Thomas Williams at Skate Canada
 

Canadian female ice dancers
1992 births
Living people
Figure skaters from Calgary